Assignee was an American Thoroughbred racehorse. He won the 1894 Preakness Stakes.

Pedigree

References

Racehorses bred in the United States
Racehorses trained in the United States
Preakness Stakes winners
1891 racehorse births
Thoroughbred family 2
Godolphin Arabian sire line